The 2021 Leagues Cup was the second edition of the Leagues Cup organized by Major League Soccer and the Mexican Football Federation. The tournament was originally planned to include sixteen teams but was later reduced to eight teams.

The 2020 edition of the tournament was canceled in May 2020 due to the ongoing COVID-19 pandemic in North America. In the final, León defeated Seattle Sounders FC 3–2 to win their first title.

Qualification
The top two Major League Soccer teams from each conference in the 2020 season who did not qualify for the 2021 CONCACAF Champions League qualified for the Leagues Cup.

The top four Liga MX from the 2020–21 aggregate table who are not competing in the 2021 CONCACAF Champions League semifinals or the 2021 Campeones Cup qualified for the Leagues Cup.

Matchups and schedule

On July 7, 2021, Major League Soccer and Liga MX announced the Leagues Cup schedule as well as the opening round matches.

Results

Quarterfinals

Semifinals

Final

Top goalscorers

References

 

2021 in American soccer
2021–22 in Mexican football
August 2021 sports events in the United States
2021
September 2021 sports events in the United States